Bisaralli is a village in Dharwad district of Karnataka, India.

Demographics 
As of the 2011 Census of India there were 212 households in Bisaralli and a total population of 942 consisting of 475 males and 467 females. There were 133 children ages 0-6.

References

Villages in Dharwad district